The Elephants Playground is a rock formation located in Genesee, Plumas County, California. The area burned in the 2019 Walker Fire.

Description
Elephant's Playground was named by early Anglo-American settlers because the boulders can resemble a herd of elephant torsos. The boulder rock formations are huge, round, somewhat smooth and tightly packed.

Elephants Playground has been noted for its unusual place name.

See also
Antelope Lake
Indian Creek

References

External links 
Elephants Playground (area)
Elephants Playground, Plumas County, California, USA - Maps, Photos, Weather, Local Links

Landforms of Plumas County, California
Rock formations of California